Menemen railway station is a railway station at Menemen in Izmir Province, Turkey. The station is served by the Turkish State Railways, the national rail carrier of Turkey. The station is serviced by six trains daily. Northbound trains go to either Bandırma, Ankara, Afyon or Uşak and southbound trains all go to Alsancak Terminal in İzmir. North of the station, the double track branch line to Aliağa splits from the main line. The original station was built in 1866 by the Smyrna Cassaba Railway.

History
The station was opened in 1866, by the Smyrna Cassaba Railway (SCP). A passenger train from Basmane Terminal in İzmir served the station to Bandırma and Uşak, then Afyon. The Republic of Turkey was formed in 1923 and the Turkish State Railways (TCDD) were formed in 1927 to nationalize Turkey's railways. SCP was absorbed by TCDD on June 1, 1934. TCDD rebuilt the station and broadened the tracks in 1938. The line was made double track in 1975 and electrified with 25 kV AC overhead wire in 2002. From 2006 to 2010 the Basmane-Ulukent section of the line in İzmir was closed, due to the construction of the Karşıyaka Railway Tunnel. During this time the tracks in the station were used as a yard for passenger trains. When the line re-opened on May 19, 2010, the station was no longer used as a yard. The elevated platform section will be converted for use of the new İzmir Commuter Rail system (İZBAN).

References

1866 establishments in the Ottoman Empire
Railway stations in İzmir Province
Railway stations opened in 1866
Menemen District